Yelena Ilyukhina (born 24 May 1982) is a Kazakhstani handball player. She was born in Kyzylorda. She competed at the 2008 Summer Olympics in Beijing, where the Kazakhstani team placed 10th.

References

External links

1982 births
Living people
People from Kyzylorda
Kazakhstani female handball players
Olympic handball players of Kazakhstan

Handball players at the 2008 Summer Olympics
21st-century Kazakhstani women